The 2018 Calgary Stampeders season was the 61st season for the team in the Canadian Football League and their 84th overall. The Stampeders qualified for the playoffs for the 14th straight year and finished in first place in the West Division for the third straight year. They also appeared in the Grey Cup for the third consecutive season, but after two championship losses, the Stampeders claimed victory in the 106th Grey Cup game, the franchise's eighth victory overall. This season was Dave Dickenson's third season as head coach and John Hufnagel's 11th season as general manager.

Offseason

CFL draft
The 2018 CFL Draft took place on May 3, 2018. By virtue of being a Grey Cup finalist, the Stampeders had the second-to-last selection in each of the eight rounds. The team upgraded their fourth-round pick after trading Charleston Hughes to the Hamilton Tiger-Cats. The team also acquired an additional pick in the fifth round from the Ottawa Redblacks in a trade for Drew Tate.

Preseason

Regular season

Standings

Schedule
For the second consecutive year, the Calgary Stampeders experienced a two-game losing streak with their loss to the Saskatchewan Roughriders on October 20. They had previously experienced a three-game losing streak to close out the 2017 (which had been the first time in ten years to lose three games consecutive and around five years to have lost at least two games consecutive). With the loss, Saskatchewan is the only team that the Calgary Stampeders have a losing record against in 2018 as of October 20 (though they could have a losing record to the BC Lions as well if they lose their November 3 game to the team. For the second consecutive season, the Calgary Stampeders lost three consecutive games after 10 years without experiencing such a streak (and the first time Bo Levi Mitchell had such a streak as a starting QB in the Canadian Football League). With the loss to the Winnipeg Blue Bombers, the Edmonton Eskimos were officially eliminated from playoff contention in 2018 (the first time the team was eliminated from the playoffs since 2013).

Post season

Schedule

Team

Roster

Coaching staff

References

External links
 

Calgary Stampeders seasons
2018 Canadian Football League season by team
2018 in Alberta
Grey Cup championship seasons